Portgordon Victoria Football Club was a Scottish football club based in the town of Buckie, Moray. Formed in 2006 as a Welfare club playing over the summer months, they successfully applied for membership of the Scottish Junior Football Association in 2011, and last played in the SJFA North First Division (West).

Initially, the club was known as Buckie Victoria however when the club secured Gordon Park in Portgordon as their home ground, a proviso was made that the village name is incorporated in the club's title. Gordon Park had previously been home to a Portgordon United club in the Juniors from 1993 to 2002. A cash dispute with former committee members of United led to the club being evicted in December 2013 and after a nomadic spell, the club were using Linzee Gordon Park in Buckie as their home.

The club announced in June 2015 they would be taking a year out after failing to find a new manager.

References

External links
 Club website
 Scottish Football Historical Archive

 

Football in Moray
Football clubs in Scotland
Scottish Junior Football Association clubs
Association football clubs established in 2006
2006 establishments in Scotland
2015 disestablishments in Scotland
Defunct football clubs in Scotland
Buckie